Kenneth MacLean Glazier Sr. (September 21, 1912 - November 11, 1989) was a Canadian minister and librarian.

He was minister of Glenview Presbyterian Church in Toronto before working at the Hoover Institution at Stanford University. He later served as chief librarian of the University of Calgary Library.

While at the University of Calgary, he established in the Rare Books and Special Collections of the library the Kenneth M. Glazier Collection of the papers of Canadian authors, including those of Hugh MacLennan and Mordecai Richler.

He founded the Kenneth Maclean Glazier Scholarship for the study of Canadian literature at the university. He wrote or edited Africa South of the Sahara: A Select & Annotated Bibliography, 1964-1968, South Africa; a collection of miscellaneous documents, 1902-1963, and, with Peter Duigan, he authored A checklist of serials for African studies.

Politics
He was Secretary of the Alberta Liberal Party.

Family
In 1940 he married Lily Teresa Ferster; they had three children: Gretchen, and twins, Christopher and Kenneth.

Death
He died of a heart attack in Calgary on November 11, 1989.

Kenneth MacLean Glazier
It is important to distinguish him from his son, Kenneth MacLean Glazier (Harvard Student Strike), who is a California attorney, known as "Kenneth M. Glazier" or "Kenneth MacLean Glazier" although there are instances of Kenneth M. Glazier Sr. being referred to as such following his son's birth.

References

External links
Special Collections - University of Calgary Library

1912 births
1989 deaths
Canadian clergy
Canadian librarians
Canadian non-fiction writers
Canadian Presbyterian ministers
Writers from Calgary
Writers from Toronto
Hoover Institution people
20th-century non-fiction writers